Dawson Tower, is located on Kadugannawa in the Kadugannawa Pass next to the Colombo - Kandy Road, the first modern highway in the island. Work began on the Colombo - Kandy Road in 1820 under the direction of Captain William Francis Dawson who died during the project. The Dawson Tower was erected in memory of Dawson.

History
Under the direction of Governor Edward Barnes, Captain William Francis Dawson initiated the construction of the Colombo-Kandy road project in 1820. Unfortunately, he died on 28 March 1829, before the completion of the construction work. It is said that he had been bitten by a venomous snake. Dawson Tower was erected in 1832 as a posthumous memorial to Dawson’s exemplary service to the country.

The tower location was selected as it was a few meters away from the Kadugannawa pass which stands witness to Dawson’s technical expertise and engineering skills.

Images

See also 
 Kadugannawa Ambalama
 National railway museum, Kadugannawa

References

Monuments and memorials in Sri Lanka
Towers in Sri Lanka
British colonial architecture in Sri Lanka
Archaeological protected monuments in Kandy District
Buildings and structures in Kandy District